The Lachine Rapids are a series of rapids on the Saint Lawrence River, between the Island of Montreal and the south shore. They are located near the former city of Lachine.
The Lachine Rapids contain large standing waves because the water volume and current do not change with respect to the permanent features in the riverbed, namely its shelf-like drops. Seasonal variation in the water flow does not change the position of the waves, although it does change their size and shape.
In the past these represented a considerable barrier to maritime traffic. Until the construction of the Lachine Canal through Montreal, the rapids had to be portaged. Even with the canal, the difficulty was such that it was usually more convenient to ship goods by rail to Montreal, where they could be loaded at the city's port. Montreal remains a major rail hub and one of Canada's largest ports for that reason.

The Lachine Rapids are now passed by the South Shore Canal (Saint-Lambert and Côte Sainte-Catherine locks) of the Saint Lawrence Seaway.

Wildlife 
The rapids contain a number of islands used by migratory birds.

History 

The first European to see the rapids was Jacques Cartier, who sailed up the St. Lawrence River in 1535, believing he had found the Northwest Passage. In 1611, Samuel de Champlain named the rapids Sault Saint-Louis, after a teenaged crewman named Louis who drowned here; the name later extended to Lac Saint-Louis. This name remained in use until the mid-19th century, but later came to be replaced by the name of the adjacent town of Lachine.

The first Europeans known to have traveled above these rapids were Champlain and Étienne Brûlé on the 13 June 1611. Brûlé continued upriver to live among the Algonquin, while Champlain himself would not travel further up the Ottawa River until May 1613.

The first person to design a ship capable of shooting the Lachine Rapids was shipbuilder and carpenter John McQuaid, a native of County Armagh, Ireland who later settled in Kingston, Ontario with his family.

Recreation 
Whitewater rafting and jet boat expeditions to the rapids are available in Montreal. Though a life jacket is required. Whitewater kayaking has become popular, along with river surfing, on a standing wave adjacent to the Habitat 67.().

References 

Landforms of Montreal
Portages in Canada
Saint Lawrence River
Landforms of Montérégie
Tourist attractions in Montérégie
Lachine, Quebec
Bodies of water of Quebec
Rapids of Canada